The Spelman College Museum of Fine Art is a museum located on the Spelman College campus in Atlanta. The museum is housed in the Camille O. Hanks Cosby Academic Center named after philanthropist Camille Cosby, who had two daughters attend Spelman College. The museum states that it is the only museum in the nation dedicated to art by and about women of the African diaspora.

Some Black women artists the museum has featured include Amy Sherald, Mickalene Thomas, and Reneé Stout.  Each semester, the museum features a new exhibit; past exhibits have included artists Beverly Buchanan (2017) and Zanele Muholi.

History 
The museum was established in 1996. Andrea Barnwell Brownlee was the director of the museum from 2001 until her departure in December 2020. Liz Andrews was named her successor in 2021.

References

Art museums and galleries in Georgia (U.S. state)
African-American museums in Georgia (U.S. state)
Museums in Atlanta
Spelman College
University museums in Georgia (U.S. state)
Women's museums in the United States